John Lafayette Magee (October 28, 1914 – December 16, 2005) was an American chemist known for his work on kinetic models of radiation chemistry, especially the Samuel-Magee model for describing radiolysis in solution.

Education and career
Magee obtained his A.B. at Mississippi College in 1935, M.S. at Vanderbilt University in 1936, and his Ph.D. in chemistry at University of Wisconsin in 1939, under the supervision of Farrington Daniels. He then worked with Henry Eyring at Princeton University during his postdoctoral research. Between 1943 and 1946, he worked at the Los Alamos National Laboratory on the Manhattan Project. Afterwards, he moved to Argonne National Laboratory. In 1948, he joined the Department of Chemistry at University of Notre Dame at the invitation of Milton Burton and became a full professor in 1953. He became the director of the Radiation Laboratory at Notre Dame between 1971 and 1975. He moved to Lawrence Berkeley National Laboratory afterwards, conducting research on the biological effects of ionizing radiation. He retired from Berkeley in 1986.

Magee was elected president of the Radiation Research Society for the year 1967, and he became a fellow of the American Physical Society in 1976.

Bibliography

Paper series

Reviews

Books

See also
 Milton Burton
 Spur (chemistry)

References

20th-century American chemists
Mississippi College alumni
Vanderbilt University alumni
University of Wisconsin–Madison alumni
Princeton University faculty
Los Alamos National Laboratory personnel
Manhattan Project people
Argonne National Laboratory people
University of Notre Dame faculty
1914 births
2005 deaths
Radiobiologists
Theoretical chemists
Fellows of the American Physical Society